Cinco Chagas was a Portuguese carrack She was constructed from 1559 to 1560 in Goa. The Portuguese viceroy Dom Constantino de Braganza supervised the process. C. R. Boxer considers her to have been "probably the most famous of the India-built carracks." Cinco Chagas, nicknamed Constantina, was in service for around twenty six years, making nine or ten trips between Portugal and the East Indies. She was also a flagship for five Portuguese viceroys. The historian Dave Horner writes that this was probably a record, because ships were "lucky if they survived two or three roundtrips".

At the end of her career, she was laid up as a hulk in Lisbon harbour. When she was finally broken-up, King Philip II of Spain, who had become the King of Portugal in 1580, acquired the ship's keel as a trophy, and was buried in a coffin made from its wood in 1598 as a symbol of his empire's global domination.

References

Bibliography 

  (Portuguese)
 
 
 
 
 
 

Carracks
16th-century ships